Olutolani "Tolani" Ibikunle (born May 2, 1992) is an American professional soccer player.

Early life and career

Early life and career
Tolani was born in Pennsylvania to Ade and Tayo Ibikunle, in 1992. He attended high school at St. Joseph's Preparatory School in Philadelphia, Pa.
Ibikunle played college soccer at Wake Forest University between 2010 and 2013.

While at college, Ibikunle also appeared for USL PDL club Reading United AC in their 2012 season.

Professional career
On January 16, 2014 it was announced that Ibikunle had been drafted by Colorado Rapids of Major League Soccer in the third-round (49th overall) of the 2014 MLS SuperDraft. However, Ibikunle didn't earn a contract with Colorado.

On March 24, 2014 Ibikunle signed with USL Pro club Charlotte Eagles.

References

External links 

1992 births
Living people
American people of Yoruba descent
American soccer players
Association football defenders
Charlotte Eagles players
Colorado Rapids draft picks
People from Lower Merion Township, Pennsylvania
Reading United A.C. players
Soccer players from Pennsylvania
Sportspeople from Montgomery County, Pennsylvania
USL Championship players
USL League Two players
Wake Forest Demon Deacons men's soccer players
Yoruba sportspeople